This article lists the presidents of the Parliament of Catalonia.

List

References

External links

Catalonia, Parliament of